Ivan Atanassov Petrov,  (Bulgarian: Иван Атанасов Петров) (b. 1947) is a noted Bulgarian neurologist and head of the Clinic of Neurology at the Medical Institute of the Ministry of Internal Affairs in Sofia, Bulgaria, and holds an MD, and PhD.

His research on biopsy investigation of muscle and peripheral nerves in neuromuscular diseases has made significant contributions to neurological science . He is the author of more than 120 scientific publications in the areas of neuropathology, postherpetic neuralgia and multiple sclerosis. He sits on the editorial boards of the journal of Cerebrovascular Diseases and the journal of Bulgarian Neurology.

He is married to the Bulgarian nutritionist Stefka Petrova and has one son.

External links
 Medical institute of the Ministry of internal affairs
 Bulgarian Society of Neurology

Bulgarian neurologists
Living people
1947 births